The Baray (Barayı) is a river in the Sakha Republic (Yakutia), Russia, a right tributary of the Aldan, part of the Lena basin. 

There are no settlements in the area of the river. The nearest inhabited places are Udarnik, Krest-Khaldzhay and Ary-Tolon of Tompo District to the east of the river's mouth.

Course
The Baray originates in the southwestern Verkhoyansk Range, near the source of the Nelgese and  not far west of the Khunkhadin Range. In the upper section of its course the river flows across mountainous terrain, heading roughly southwards and flanking the eastern end of the Sordogin Range. 

After leaving the mountainous area the Baray turns slightly and flows in a roughly SW direction across a floodplain dotted with about 130 lakes. Finally the Baray meets the right bank of the Aldan River in a vast swampy area where it makes a sharp westward bend, a little upstream from the mouth of the Tukulan and downstream of the Tompo,  from the confluence of the Aldan with the Lena. Its mouth is near the mouth of the Tatta on the facing bank.

The Baray freezes in mid-October and stays frozen until the end of May.

See also
List of rivers of Russia

References

External links
Fishing in the Baray River

Rivers of the Sakha Republic
Verkhoyansk Range
Central Yakutian Lowland